John Wills (1846 – 20 June 1906) was an architect based in Derby.

Personal life

He lived at Dodbrook, 136 Whitaker Road, Derby, a house he designed himself.

For many years he was president of the Derby and Derbyshire Band of Hope Union, and treasurer of the South Derbyshire Liberal Association. He was also a councillor on Derby Town Council for the Becket Ward in the 1880s. He was a trustee of Green-hill Chapel in Derby.

He died in Salcombe, Devon on 20 June 1906.

Career

He formed a partnership with his sons William Francis Wills (b. 1877) and John Ross Wills (b. 1882). His practice was based at Victoria Street Chambers in Derby. He was responsible for building many non-conformist chapels in the Midlands and in the southeastern counties of Sussex, Middlesex, Essex and Kent.  He has been called the "pre-eminent architect" of Baptist chapels in Kent, where his designs ranged from expensive, large chapels in towns to small wayside chapels in rural areas. His Baptist church at Holland Road in Hove has been called one of the most important Nonconformist chapels of the Victorian era in Sussex.

He was the author of Hints to Trustees of Chapel Property and Chapel Keepers' Manual which was in its 3rd edition by 1884.

Buildings

References

Bibliography

19th-century English architects
Councillors in Derbyshire
1846 births
1906 deaths
Architects from Derby